Pop Smear is a studio album by the Verve Pipe, released in 1993. The album sold around 50,000 copies, which resulted in interest from major labels. The band signed with RCA Records, and the album was rereleased in 1996.

Production
The Verve Pipe funded the album's recording sessions out of its winnings from the Yamaha Soundcheck's unsigned band competition.

Critical reception
Trouser Press wrote that "the songs are sturdier and harder-hitting, the new muscle coming from plain old artistic growth plus the addition of guitarist A.J. Dunning."

Track listing
"Pretty for You"
"Spoonful of Sugar"
"Victoria"
"Honest"
"The River"
"Sleepy Town"
"Bullies on Vacation"
"What You Wanted"
"Wanna Be"
"Out Like a Lamb"
"Senator Speak"
"Is It Worth It?"

Personnel
The Verve Pipe
Brian Vander Ark — vocals, electric and acoustic guitars
A.J. Dunning — vocals, electric, acoustic, slide and lead guitars, keyboards, mandolin
Brad Vander Ark — vocals, bass, percussion
Don Brown — vocals, drums, percussion
Additional personnel
Kathryn Dykema — cello
Doug Corella — percussion
Mark Byerly — trumpet
Albin Rose — viola
E. Rose — violin
Bob Engelsman — trombone
Randy Sly — keyboards
Tom "Mallets" Jansen — bells

References

The Verve Pipe albums
1993 albums
RCA Records albums